Altaev is a surname. Notable people with the surname include:

Al Altaev (1872-1959), Soviet children's book author
Nūrjan Ältaev (born 1978), Kazakh politician